Imma penthinoides is a moth in the family Immidae. It was described by Pagenstecher in 1884. It is found on the Moluccas.

References

Moths described in 1884
Immidae
Moths of Indonesia